The Lost Cabin and the Mystery Trees is an album by Roots music band Lost Dogs, released on Fools of the World records in 2006.

Track listing
 "Broken Like Brooklyn" (Taylor)
 "Devil's Elbow" (Taylor)
 "The Lost Cabin and the Mystery Trees" (Taylor)
 "Whispering Memories" (Daugherty/Hindalong)
 "One More Day" (Roe)
 "This Business Is Goin' Down" (Taylor)
 "Hardening My Heart" (Taylor)
 "Only One Bum In Corona del Mar" (Taylor)
 "Get Me Ready" (Taylor)
 "Burn It Up" (Daugherty/Hindalong)
 "That's Where Jesus Is" (Taylor)

Personnel
Derri Daugherty — vocals, guitar, and bass
Steve Hindalong — drums, percussion, harp, and glockenspiel
Mike Roe — vocals, guitar, and bass
Terry Scott Taylor — vocals and guitar

Additional musicians
Jerry Chamberlain — background vocal on "Get Me Ready"
Tim Chandler — bass
Shane & Chance Daugherty — background vocals on "Corona Del Mar"
Matt Slocum — pedal steel

Production notes
Recorded and mixed by Derri Daugherty at Sled Dog, Franklin, Tennessee
Mastered by Richard Dodd, Nashville, Tennessee
Additional Recording by Mark Harmon at the Harm Farm, Loomis, California ("One More Day")
Cover illustrations & Photography by: Jimmy Abegg (Jimmy Industries)
Design Assembled by Brian Heydn (SpireHouse Design Studio).

Lost Dogs albums
2006 albums